The Bill Steers Men's 4-Miler (formerly Charlottesville Men's Four Miler) is the only all men's run in the Charlottesville area. The race was rededicated as a tribute to William D. Steers in 2015. It is an annual event hosted by the Charlottesville Track Club. The event has also been sponsored by Panera Bread, BMW of Charlottesville, Starbucks, Pepsi and the City of Charlottesville. The City of Charlottesville also hosts the Women's Four Miler to benefit the UVA Cancer Center Breast Care Program. The event, held continuously since 2004, was conceived by William D. Steers with the purpose of raising awareness on men's health issues; to encourage men to take control of their health, and become more physically active.

Eligibility
The Bill Steers Men's 4-Miler is open to runners of all ages from all nations. Participants are not required to pre-qualify. Particular attention, and encouragement is given to men who are in need of physical activity, or out-of-shape. The focus of Charlottesville Men's Four Miler is to promote physical activity in sedentary males, and their immediate families.

Training Program
The Charlottesville Men's Four Miler Training Program meets as a group during the nine weeks preceding the race. The supervised program aims to assist runners to achieve successful completion of the foot race, and to encourage participants to engage in regular exercise as a part of an overall healthy lifestyle. Mark Lorenzoni has served as coach since the program started in 2004. The novice group starts training in two laps on the track, and eventually working up to the full four miles intended for the actual race.

Course | 2014
The Tenth Anniversary of the 'Charlottesville Men's Four Miler race was held on Saturday May 24, 2014. The starting line was at the west parking lot of Scott Stadium. The signal to start was flagged by former UVa Women's Basketball coach Debbie Ryan, inducted into the Women's Basketball Hall of Fame (add a link ?) in 2008. Runners quickly moved along Alderman Rd. towards McCormick Rd., Rugby Road and onto Grady Ave. The course continued to Cabell Ave., Burnley Ave., and Tunlaw Place. At Tunlaw Place participants turned left onto Rosser Ave. and then back to Rugby Rd., and McCormick Rd. In the intersection of McCormick and Alderman runners turned left, and then left again onto Whitehead Rd.. Finally, onto Stadium Rd., and the Scott Stadium tunnel, which leads into the field where the Finish Line was set up.

List of Recent Winners

First to Third Place | 2014 - 2012

References

External links
 Charlottesville Men's Four Miler 
 Charlottesville Track Club 
Rugged Mountain Team

Photo and video stories
 2014 Men's Four Miler Slideshow 
 Facebook Photo Album 

Road running competitions in the United States
Recurring sporting events established in 2004
Annual sporting events in the United States
University of Virginia
Sports in Virginia
2004 establishments in Virginia